Bernard James Brophy (3 January 1889 – 24 July 1965) was an Australian rules footballer who played for the Fitzroy Football Club in the Victorian Football League (VFL).

Notes

External links 
		

1889 births
1965 deaths
Australian rules footballers from Victoria (Australia)
Fitzroy Football Club players